Golden Days is a summer village in Alberta, Canada. It is located on the northwestern shore of Pigeon Lake.

Demographics 

In the 2016 Census of Population conducted by Statistics Canada, the Summer Village of Golden Days had a population of 160 living in 78 of its 293 total private dwellings, a  change from its 2011 population of 141.

See also 
List of communities in Alberta
List of summer villages in Alberta
List of resort villages in Saskatchewan

References

External links 

1965 establishments in Alberta
Edmonton Metropolitan Region
Leduc County
Summer villages in Alberta